Associazione Sportiva Dilettantistica FC Sassari Torres Femminile (usually referred to simply as Torres or sometimes named Eurospin Torres due to sponsorship) is an Italian women's association football club based in Sassari, Sardinia. The club was formed in 1980 and competed in women's Serie A until 2015. Torres's colours were blue and red. The team won seven scudetti and eight Italian Women's Cups. They were refused a license for the 2015–16 Serie A season due to debts and now compete in Serie B.

After winning two doubles in 2000 and 2001, Torres became the first team to represent Italy in the newly founded UEFA Women's Cup. After 2009–10 the team was a regular competitor in the rebranded UEFA Women's Champions League, reaching the quarter-finals on three occasions.

History

Beginnings
 The club was founded in 1980 as A.C.F. Delco Costruzioni of Sassari and affiliated to the Federazione Italiana Calcio Femminile (FIGCF; Italy's autonomous women's football association). They began playing in the 1981 season, enrolling in the local division of Serie C.

In 1989, by then known as CUS Sassari, the team won the Sardinian section of Serie C and promotion to Serie B. The next season the club won its league again and arrived in Serie A for the first time. In the club's first season at the top level, 1990–91, the team won their first Italian Women's Cup. In 1993–94 the goals of Carolina Morace secured a first Scudetto. The following season, without Morace, the title was lost but the team won their second Italian Cup.

Early trophies
Between 1999 and 2005, Torres won two league titles, four Italian Cups, two Italian Super Cups and the Italy Women's Cup, as well as establishing the record of 38 consecutive wins in official matches including league and Italian Cup. Torres was the first Italian team to participate in the UEFA Women's Cup, the female version of the UEFA Champions League.

In 2008, after finishing second in the league, Torres won a seventh Italian Women's Cup by beating Bardolino 1–0 in the final's second leg, overturning a 3–2 defeat in the first leg. Throughout this period, Torres' success rested on the prolific goal-scoring of players such as Rita Guarino, Pamela Conti and the Spaniard Ángeles Parejo.

Burgeoning success
In the 2009–10 season Torres won a fourth Scudetto, dominating the league from the first day. The club also secured the Super Cup, but were beaten in the final of the Italian Women's Cup. A successful season was crowned by an appearance in the UEFA Women's Champions League quarter-finals. 2010–11 culminated in a treble of the Super Cup, Scudetto and Italian Women's Cup. In the following season, Torres collected a Scudetto and Super Cup double, but lost out in the semi-finals of the Italian Women's Cup. In 2013 they retained the league title and were named fifth in the year's best women's clubs by the International Federation of Football History & Statistics (IFFHS).

The 2013–14 season yielded a Super Cup and runners-up finishes in the league and Italian Women's Cup, as well as another quarter-final placing in the UEFA Women's Champions League. Patrizia Panico scored more than 40 league goals. But Torres were thrashed 12–1 on aggregate by Turbine Potsdam and overall the season was considered to be below expectations. A dispute over funding and the club's strategic direction saw the departure of both president Leonardo Marras and coach Manuela Tesse in 2014.

Insolvency and Promotion 

Torres were subsumed into the structure of Torres' male club in June 2014. In September 2015 it was announced that Torres had been refused a license for the forthcoming Serie A season and would be excluded from taking part. La Lega Nazionale Dilettanti, who oversee women's football in Italy, demanded that the club's new owners pay half of the total €90,000 debt up front, rejecting a proposed alternative repayment arrangement which the male club offered to underwrite. In 2021 got promoted again Serie B, after the season 2020-21 in Serie C (level 3).

Stadium
The team play in the Stadio Vanni Sanna in Sassari, the complex is belong S.E.F. Torres 1903. Here plays also U.S.D. Latte Dolce.

2022–23 squad

Former players
For details of current and former players, see :Category:Torres Calcio Femminile players.

Record in UEFA competitions

Honours
Torres have won the most trophies of all Italian women's clubs.

League
 Serie A (level 1)
  Winners (7): 1993–94, 1999–00, 2000–01, 2009–10, 2010–11, 2011–12, 2012–13

 Serie B (level 2)
  Winners (1): 1989–90

 Serie C (level 3)
  Winners (1): 2020-21

Cups
 Coppa Italia
 Winners (8): 1990–91,        1994–95, 1999–00, 2000–01, 2003–04, 2004–05, 2007–08, 2010–11
  Runners-up (3) 2008–09,        2009–10, 2013–14  

 Supercoppa Italiana
 Winners (7):  2000, 2004, 2009, 2010, 2011, 2012, 2013

Italy Women's Cup
  Winners (2): 2004, 2008
  Runners-up (1) 2005,

Individual Player & Coach awards
Top Scorer
 Patrizia Panico UEFA Women's Champions League: 2012–13 (8 goals)
 Patrizia Panico Serie A: 2013–14 (43goals)
 Patrizia Panico Serie A: 2012–13 (35 goals)
 Patrizia Panico Serie A: 2011–12 (26 goals)
 Patrizia Panico Serie A: 2010–11 (29 goals)
 Carolina Morace Serie A: 1993–94 (33 goals)

League and cup history

{|class="wikitable"
|-bgcolor="#efefef"
! Season
! Div.
! Pos.
! Pl.
! W
! D
! L
! GS
! GA
! P
!Domestic Cup
!colspan=2|Other
!Notes
|-bgcolor=PowderBlue
|align=center|2021–22
|align=center|Serie B
|align=center|5
|align=center|26
|align=center|13	 	
|align=center|3
|align=center|10
|align=center|35
|align=center|37
|align=center|42
|align=center|
|align=center|
|align=center|
|align=center|
|}

Gallery

See also
 S.E.F. Torres 1903 
 U.S.D. Latte Dolce
 Dinamo Basket Sassari

References

External links
Torres Calcio Femminile website
UEFA profile

Torres
Sassari
Sport in Sardinia
Football clubs in Sardinia
1980 establishments in Italy
Serie A (women's football) clubs